Canute of Denmark - Danish: Knud - may refer to:
Six kings of Denmark
Harthacnut I of Denmark or Canute I the Hardy, legendary King of Denmark (916/17–934)
Cnut the Great, Canute II the Great, (985/95–1035), King of Denmark (1018–1035), Norway and England
Harthacnut, Canute III the Hardy, (1020–1042), King of Denmark (1035–1042) and England
Canute IV of Denmark, the Saint, (1042-1086), King of Denmark (1080–1086)
Canute V of Denmark, Canute V Magnussen, (1129–1157), King of Denmark (1146-1157)
Canute VI of Denmark, Canute VI Valdemarsen, (1163–1202), King of Denmark (1182–1202)
Six princes of Denmark
Canute Danaást (d. 962), son of king Gorm the Old
Canute Lavard (1090–1131), son of king Eric I of Denmark
Canute Haraldsen (d. 1135), son of Harald Kesja
Canute Eriksen (d. bef. 1250), son of king Eric IV of Denmark
Canute, Duke of Estonia (1205–1260), bastard son of Valdemar II of Denmark
Knud, Hereditary Prince of Denmark (1900–1976), son of king Christian X of Denmark